Carolina Alejandra Torres Guzmán (born March 16, 1979, in Temuco) is a Chilean pole vaulter.

She won the silver medal at the 2003 Pan American Games in Santo Domingo, vaulting her personal best of 4.30 metres. She also competed at the 2004 Summer Olympics in Athens, Greece.

Competition record

References

1979 births
Living people
People from Temuco
Chilean female pole vaulters
Chilean female hurdlers
Heptathletes
Olympic pole vaulters
Olympic athletes of Chile
Athletes (track and field) at the 2004 Summer Olympics
Pan American Games competitors for Chile
Pan American Games silver medalists for Chile
Pan American Games medalists in athletics (track and field)
Athletes (track and field) at the 2003 Pan American Games
Athletes (track and field) at the 2007 Pan American Games
Medalists at the 2003 Pan American Games
World Athletics Championships athletes for Chile
21st-century Chilean women